Leo Aberer (born in Vienna on March 27, 1978), also "Leo" or "Leeone", is an Austrian pop singer. He became famous through his participation in the Ö3 soundcheck during the year 2005, the ORF-Show The Match and the preliminary decision of Eurovision Song Contest 2011 with Patricia Kaiser.

Education 
Leo Aberer has received violin lessons since he was seven years old at the Vienna Konservatorium.  Moreover, he plays guitar and keyboard after he had taught it himself. During the following years he studied jazz at Karl-Franzens-Universität in Graz. At the same time he studied Business Administration and Psychology.

Biography 
In 2003 he recorded his first album and also his debut single called "Sterne" (German for "stars").  Both allowed him the entrance into the Austrian charts with position 69 (album) and 21 for his first single. 
When participating in the Ö3 soundcheck 2005, he reached the second place and received a new record deal at Universal Music. Together with his band he tours through Austria since 2066. During the same year his single "Won´t you know" was part of the Austrian charts for more than 20 weeks. Later he published songs such as "Walking and Talking". 
In 2007 Leo Aberer was nominated for Amadeus Austrian Music Award.

As part of the initiative Die Neuen Österreicher Leo Aberer recorded the single "Kinder" (German for "children") in November 2007 together with other musicians. Their whole benefit was donated to an Austrian charity project called Licht ins Dunkel.

In 2013 he entered a new part of music business with opening his own music label "Black Baracuda" and publishing house "Leoversum" in Austria.

Leo Aberer´s video for the song "Sweet honey" reached no 14 on the international YouTube -charts on March 26, 2008. In 2010, he reinterpreted it together with Laith al Deen. After he had recorded his longplayer "Sackgasse" he left Austria and went to Los Angeles. There, he started working with rapper LL Cool J and recorded his new album.

In 2010 his album "Wann geda?" was published and made up the first charts entry for Leo Aberer for years. During the same year Leo Aberer published the song "I wanna be free".

In fall of the year 2010 he won the public vote for the Austrian preliminary decision to the Eurovision Song Contest 2011, together with Patricia Kaiser and the song "There Will Never Be Another You". "There will Never be Another You" became No 1 in the charts some days later.

In May 2012 Aberer travelled to New York City and Budapest where he produced the song "Football is my life" in collaboration with Shaggy. It became the official song for European championships in 2012
Moreover, he recorded the song "Giovanna" which entered the charts immediately (No 5 during the year 2013)

In May 2014 he got the "Erzherzog-Johann-Award" which is related to the charity project "Band für Steiermark”

Another cooperation with Shaggy took place during the World Championships in the year 2014 with the song "Football Minha Vida"..

Last but not least he started a new project in November 2014. In collaboration with Marco Angelini he recorded the song "Goodbye" which conducts the iTunes Charts since its publication. "Goodbye" reached chart position No. 9 and was part of the official Austrian Charts for weeks.

2018/2019 Leo Aberer discovered Africa. He was live on stage in great shows at CNN, Ten over 10, Citizen, Kenya Broadcasting Corporation, K24, Arena 254, Trend, Ktn, Mseto and became famous as "PAPA LEO". By the way, he helps and supports children in a school in Ukunda.

2022 June 12th Leo Aberer and his musicians were one of the acts at the Nova_Rock#2022 festival in Nickelsdorf(Burgenland/Austria) on the Red Bull Music Stage.

Discography

Albums

Others
2002: Walking and Talking (independent release)
2003: Sterne (independent release)

Song releases

References

External links 
 Official Website
 Leo Aberer discography at Discogs
 

Austrian keyboardists
21st-century Austrian male singers
Living people
1978 births
Austrian male musicians
Alternative rock singers
Alternative rock guitarists
Austrian violinists
Male violinists
Alternative rock musicians
Austrian pop singers
Reggae musicians
Austrian rappers
Austrian singer-songwriters
21st-century guitarists
21st-century violinists
21st-century male musicians